Laure Drouet (born 5 May 1970) is a French short track speed skater. She competed in three events at the 1994 Winter Olympics.

References

External links
 

1970 births
Living people
French female short track speed skaters
Olympic short track speed skaters of France
Short track speed skaters at the 1994 Winter Olympics
People from Ermont
20th-century French women